Athletic Union League may refer to:

 Athletic Union League (Dublin), association football league in the Republic of Ireland
 Cork Athletic Union League, association football league in the Republic of Ireland